Moss is a given name, and may refer to:

 Moss Burmester (born 1981), New Zealand swimmer
 Moss Cass (1927–2022), Australian politician
 Moss Kent Dickinson (1822–1897), Canadian businessman and politician
 Moss Evans (1925–2002), British trade union leader
 Moss Hart (1904–1961), American playwright
 Moss Turner-Samuels (1888–1957), British politician
 Moss Twomey (1897–1978), Irish republican and IRA leader

de:Moss (Begriffsklärung)
fr:Moss
ru:Мосс